Charles Borromeo McLaughlin (September 28, 1913 – December 14, 1978) was an American prelate of the Roman Catholic Church.  He served as the first bishop of the new Diocese of Saint Petersburg in Florida from 1968 to 1978.  He previously served as an auxiliary bishop of the Diocese of Raleigh in North Carolina from 1964 to 1968.

Biography

Early life 
Charles McLaughlin was born on September 28, 1913, in the Bronx borough of New York City. After completing seminary, McLaughlin was ordained a priest of the Archdiocese of New York by Cardinal Francis Spellman on June 6, 1941. McLaughlin later served as pastor of Our Lady of Grace Parish in Greensboro, North Carolina.

Auxiliary Bishop of Raleigh 
McLaughlin was named titular bishop of Risinium and auxiliary bishop of the Diocese of Raleigh by Pope Paul VI on January 13, 1964. McLaughlin received his episcopal consecration at Our Lady of Grace Church in Greensboro, North Carolina, on April 15, 1964, from Bishop Vincent Waters. McLaughlin, a licensed pilot, often flew from one church event to another, earning him the nickname "Hurricane Charlie."

Bishop of St. Petersburg 
On May 8, 1968, Paul VI established the Diocese of St. Petersburg, with McLaughlin as its first bishop. He was installed on June 17, 1968. The newly created diocese stretched from Crystal River to Ft. Myers, encompassing eleven Florida counties. His first task was to establish a new diocesan structure to unify priests, personnel, policy, and people from the two dioceses. He also faced the challenge of dealing with the rapidly increasing population within his diocese.  McLaughlin implemented the reforms of the Second Vatican Council.

Charles McLaughlin died in St. Petersburg on December 14, 1978. Bishop McLaughlin Catholic High School, a private, Catholic school in Spring Hill, Florida, is named for him. Knights of Columbus Assembly 1818 in Venice, Florida, bears his name as well.

References 

Additional sources
 

Roman Catholic bishops of Saint Petersburg
Participants in the Second Vatican Council
1913 births
1978 deaths
20th-century Roman Catholic bishops in the United States